

Malgra Conservation Park is a protected area in the Australian state of South Australia located on the Eyre Peninsula in the gazetted locality of Kelly about  south-east of Kimba.

The conservation park was proclaimed on 11 November 2010 under the state’s National Parks and Wildlife Act 1972 in respect to land previously dedicated as a conservation reserve known as the Malgra Conservation Reserve on 20 October 1988. The conservation park was constituted to permit access under the state’s Mining Act 1971.

As of 2014, it and three adjacent conservation parks were described by their managing authority as follows: These parks (sic) are dominated by relatively undisturbed mallee forest, and woodland associations with a Melaleuca shrub understorey. They provide important habitat for Malleefowl populations and contain significant species including Gilbert’s Whistler, Bentham’s Goodenia and the Six-nerve Spine-bush which are listed as rare under the National Parks and Wildlife Act.

The conservation park is classified as an IUCN Category VI protected area.

See also
Protected areas of South Australia

References

Conservation parks of South Australia
Protected areas established in 1988
1988 establishments in Australia
Eyre Peninsula